ZFW may refer to:

 Fort Worth Air Route Traffic Control Center, an Area Control Center in Fort Worth, Texas, United States
 Zero-fuel weight, the weight of an aircraft without fuel on board
 ZFW, the IATA code for Fairview Airport, Alberta, Canada
 ZFW, the station code for Zafarwal railway station, Pakistan